Happy Valley Shenzhen is a theme park in Nanshan District, Shenzhen, Guangdong Province, China.

Opened in 1998, it is the first of the Happy Valley theme park chain. The Playa Maya Water Park is open for five months (May to October) each year, and is themed after the Mayan civilization with buildings and statues in Mayan architectural styles. Outside the park a Happy Line monorail train has a stop near the entrance of Happy Valley.

Notable rides

Defunct Rides

See also
List of parks in Shenzhen

References

External links
 Official website

Amusement parks in Shenzhen
Nanshan District, Shenzhen
1998 establishments in China
Amusement parks opened in 1998
Shenzhen